Carl is a North Germanic male name meaning "free man". The name originates in Old West Norse. It is the first name of many Kings of Sweden including Carl XVI Gustaf. It is popular in Denmark, Estonia, Finland, Iceland, Norway, and Sweden, and was largely popularized in the United States by Scandinavian and Italian (shortened from "Carlo") descendants. Karl is a Germanic spelling which is very popular in Austria, Estonia, Germany, Norway, Sweden, and Switzerland, and was also popularized by German-speaking descendants in the USA. Other variants include the Anglo-Saxon-Frankish variant Charles, popular in Australia, Philippines, Canada, France, New Zealand, the UK and the United States, although both Karl and Carl are also widespread names in most English speaking countries; Carlo, very popular in Italy and southern Switzerland; Carlos, popular in Spain, Portugal and Latin America; and Karol, a variant in Poland and Slovakia.

List of people named Carl

Royalty and nobility
Carl XVI Gustaf of Sweden, the current Swedish monarch
Prince Carl Philip, Duke of Värmland, Prince of Sweden
Prince Carl, Duke of Västergötland
Most other Swedish and Norwegian royalty so named – see Carl of Sweden – are listed on English Wikipedia as Charles.
Carl, Duke of Württemberg (1936–2022)

As a family name
Christian Thomsen Carl (1676–1713), Danish navy officer. Middle name also given as Thomasen, Thomesen, or Thomasen.

As a given name

Carl Anderson (singer) (1945–2004), American singer and actor
Carl Asercion (1909–1990), American steel guitar player
Carl Ballantine (1917–2009), American actor
Carl Barât
Carl Barks
Carl Bildt
Carl L. Boeckmann
Carl Bradford (born 1992), American football player
Carl "Charlie" Brandt, American serial killer
Carl Brashear, U.S. Navy master diver
Carl Byrum, American football player
Carl Caldenius, Swedish geologist
Carl Carlton, American singer-songwriter
Carl Clark (1933–2015), American photographer
Carl Cohen (businessman) (1913–1986), American gambling executive and Las Vegas casino manager
Carl Cohen (philosopher) (born 1931), professor of philosophy at the University of Michigan, philosopher, and animal rights activist
Carl Colpaert
Carl Czerny, pianist
Carl Decaluwé (born 1960), Belgian politician
Carl Dobkins Jr. (1941–2020), American singer and songwriter
Carl Douglas, Jamaican musician who wrote the disco song "Kung Fu Fighting"
Carl E. Douglas, American lawyer and member of the defense team during O.J. Simpson's murder trial
Carl Earn (1921–2007), American tennis player
Carl Edwards, NASCAR Driver
Carl Etelman (1900–1963), American football back and coach
Carl Fodor
Carl Fogarty
Carl Froch 
Carl Garrigus, American football player
Carl Friedrich Gauss
Carl Giammerese (1947–), guitar player for American pop group The Buckinghams.
Carl Granderson (born 1996), American football player
Carl Grubert
Carl Gunnarsson, Swedish ice hockey player
Carl August Hagberg, Swedish linguist
Carl Hunter bassist in The Farm
Carl Icahn, American businessman
Carl von In der Maur (1852–1913), Austrian aristocrat and Liechtenstein government official
Carl Jenkinson, football (soccer) player 
Carl Johan Ståhlberg (1865–1952), Finnish jurist and the First President of the Republic of Finland
Carl Jung (1875–1961), Swiss psychiatrist and psychotherapist, founder of analytical psychology
Carl Karcher (1917-2008) American founder of the Carl's Jr. fast food restaurant chain
Carl Kasell (1934–2018), American radio personality
Carl Laemmle (1867–1939), founder of Universal Pictures
Carl Laemmle Jr. (1908–1979), producer and businessman
Carl Lawson (American football) (born 1994), American football player
Carl J. Luksic (1921–2009), American flying ace during World War II
Carl Lutz (1895–1975), Swiss vice-consul to Hungary during WWII, credited with saving over 62,000 Jews
Carl Mann (1942–2020), American rockabilly singer
Carl Menger, Austrian economist
Carl Oliver (born 1969), Bahamian sprinter and Olympic medallist
Carl Ona-Embo (born 1989), Congolese basketball player
Charles "Carl" Panzram, American serial killer
Carl Perkins (1932–1998), American singer-songwriter
Carl Philipp Emanuel Bach
Carl Posy, Israeli philosopher
Carl Pursell, American politician
Carl Reiner (1922–2020), American actor, comedian, and director
Carl Rogers, American psychologist and psychotherapist
Carl Hancock Rux, American poet, playwright, writer, singer
Carl Sagan, American astronomer, cosmologist, astrophysicist
Carl Sandburg, American poet, writer, editor
Carl Sargeant (1968-2017), Welsh politician
Carl Schueler, American race walker
Carl Smith (musician) (1927–2010), American country music singer
Carl Söderberg, Swedish ice hockey player
Carl Stockdale, American actor
Carl Heinrich Stratz, German-Russian gynecologist
Carl "Alfalfa" Switzer, American actor and singer, best known as "Alfalfa" from the Our Gang (Little Rascals) comedy shorts
Carl Olof Tallgren, Finnish politician and businessman
Carl Valeri, Australian association football player
Carl Van Doren, American critic
Carl Maria von Weber
Carl Weathers
Carl "Charles" Webb formerly unidentified man known as "Somerton Man"
Carl Wieland
Carl Wilson (1946–1998), American musician and lead guitar player for The Beach Boys
Carl Wittrock, Dutch composer and conductor
Carl Voss-Schrader (1880–1955), Finnish colonel, business director, lawyer and interior minister
Carl Yastrzemski (born 1939), American former baseball player
Carl Zeiss

As a stage name
Carl Carl, stage name of Karl Andreas Bernbrunn (1787–1854), Polish-born actor and theatre director
Margarethe Carl, stage name of Margarethe Bernbrunn (1788–1861), German soprano and actress

Fictional characters

Carl, a llama in the web series Llamas with Hats
Carl, a character from Disney's Meet the Robinsons
Carl, a character from the 1947 film Unconquered
Carl, a character from Waltzes from Vienna
Carl, a character from the Supercell game Brawl Stars
"Carl", a nickname for the Series 800 Model 101 Terminator in Terminator: Dark Fate
Carl Bentley, a character from the 1995 film Jumanji
Carl Brutananadilewski, a character from Aqua Teen Hunger Force
Carl Carlson, a character from The Simpsons
Carl Clover, a playable character in the Blazblue fighting game series.
Carl Conrad Coreander, a character in The Neverending Story
Carl Crayon, a fictional character in the Wee Sing 1988 video: Grandpa's Magical Toys
Carl Denham, a character from the 1933 film King Kong and its 2005 remake
Carl Elias, a recurring antagonist from the science fiction drama Person of Interest
Carl Fredricksen, a character from Disney-Pixar's Up
Carl Gallagher, a character in the TV series Shameless
Carl Gould, a minor character in the Arthur television show
Carl Grimes, a notoriously elusive character from the comic/TV series The Walking Dead
Carl Hamilton, a Swedish secret agent of novels by Jan Guillou
Carl Johnson, a character in the Grand Theft Auto video game series
Carl Kolchak, a character from Kolchak: The Night Stalker
Carl Rader, a character from the 1940 film Santa Fe Trail
Carl Stephans, a character from 711 Ocean Drive
Carl the Grim Rabbit, a character from Looney Tunes
Carl Wheezer, a character from The Adventures of Jimmy Neutron: Boy Genius
Carl Winslow, a character from the TV series Family Matters
 Carl Proctor, character in the Police Academy Film Series 
 Carl Sweetchuck, character in the Police Academy Film Series  
 Carl, mysterious entity first seen in the Star Trek: Discovery episode "Terra Firma, Part 1"
 Floating Carl, a benevolent ghost character from CS Cinema

Derived surnames
There are several derivations of the surname Carl, most of them originating as "son of Carl":
 Carlsen
 Carlson
 Carlsson
 Carlton
 Karlsen
 Karlson
 Karlsson

See also

 Cari (name)
Carle, surnames
Carle (given name)
 Carli (given name)
 Carlo (name)
 Carla
 Carol (given name)
 Caroline (name)
 Carly
 Charl (name)
 Karla (name)

References

Dutch masculine given names
Masculine given names
Swedish masculine given names
Norwegian masculine given names
Danish masculine given names
Icelandic masculine given names
German masculine given names
English masculine given names

ca:Carles
fi:Kaarle